Ben Lewis (1894–1970) was an American film editor who worked in Hollywood for several decades. He was employed by MGM for many years, beginning his career with them in the silent era. An early credit was for Quality Street (1927) starring Marion Davies.

Filmography 

 Ben Hur (1925)
 Money Talks (1926)
 The Boob (1926)
 The Flaming Forest (1926)
 The Devil's Circus (1926)
 Mr. Wu (1927)
 Quality Street (1927)
 Under the Black Eagle (1928)
 Across to Singapore (1928)
 White Shadows in the South Seas (1928)
 Honeymoon (1928)
 A Single Man (1929)
 The Pagan (1929)
 Thunder (1929)
 The Kiss (1929)
 Trader Horn (1931)
 Never the Twain Shall Meet (1931)
 The Man in Possession (1931)
 Tarzan the Ape Man (1932)
 Night Court (1932)
 The Washington Masquerade (1932)
 The Mask of Fu Manchu (1932)
 Whistling in the Dark (1933)
 Fast Workers (1933)
 The Stranger's Return (1933)
 Dinner at Eight (1933)
 Broadway to Hollywood (1933)
 You Can't Buy Everything (1934)
 Manhattan Melodrama (1934)
 Have a Heart (1934)
 A Wicked Woman (1934)
 Society Doctor (1935)
 Mark of the Vampire (1935)
 Woman Wanted (1935)
 The Garden Murder Case (1936)
 Moonlight Murder (1936)
 Speed (1936)
 Under Cover of Night (1937)
 The Good Earth (1937)
 Personal Property (1937)
 They Gave Him a Gun (1937)
 The Last Gangster (1937)
 Bad Guy (1937)
 Arsène Lupin Returns (1938)
 Judge Hardy's Children (1938)
 Hold That Kiss (1938)
 Love Finds Andy Hardy (1938)
 Vacation from Love (1938)
 Out West with the Hardys (1938)
 Burn 'Em Up O'Connor (1939)
 The Hardys Ride High (1939)
 Andy Hardy Gets Spring Fever (1939)
 Judge Hardy and Son (1939)
 Forty Little Mothers (1940)
 Strike Up the Band (1940)
 Gallant Sons (1940)
 Men of Boys Town (1941)
 Love Crazy (1941)
 Down in San Diego (1941)
 Married Bachelor (1941)
 The Bugle Sounds (1942)
 Rio Rita (1942)
 Pacific Rendezvous (1942)
 For Me and My Gal (1942)
 Whistling in Brooklyn (1943)
 Lassie Come Home (1943)
 Kismet (1944)
 Lost in a Harem (1944)
 Son of Lassie (1945)
 Abbott and Costello in Hollywood (1945)
 Bad Bascomb (1946)
 The Cockeyed Miracle (1946)
 The Mighty McGurk (1947)
 Undercover Maisie (1947)
 Alias a Gentleman (1948)
 A Southern Yankee (1948)
 The Stratton Story (1949)
 Malaya (1949)
 Ambush (1950)
 Three Little Words (1950)
 It's a Big Country (1951)
 The Unknown Man (1951)
 The Red Badge of Courage (1951)
 The Devil Makes Three (1952)
 Shadow in the Sky (1952)
 Big Leaguer (1953)
 The Girl Who Had Everything (1953)
 A Slight Case of Larceny (1953)
 Tennessee Champ (1954)
 Many Rivers to Cross (1955)
 The Scarlet Coat (1955)
 The Last Hunt (1956)
 These Wilder Years (1956)
 Hot Summer Night (1957)
 The Vintage (1957)
 Tip on a Dead Jockey (1957)
 Handle with Care (1958)
 High School Confidential (1958)
 Night of the Quarter Moon (1959)
 The Beat Generation (1959)
 The Big Operator (1959)
 The Subterraneans (1960)
 Atlantis, the Lost Continent (1961)
 The Honeymoon Machine (1961)
 The Lawbreakers (1961)
 The Four Horsemen of the Apocalypse (1962)
 Drums of Africa (1963)
 Get Yourself a College Girl (1964)
 Kissin' Cousins (1964)
 Your Cheatin' Heart (1964)
 When the Boys Meet the Girls (1965)
 Harum Scarum (1965)
 Hold On! (1966)
 Hot Rods to Hell (1967)
 The Fastest Guitar Alive (1967)
 Riot on Sunset Strip (1967)
 For Singles Only (1968)
 A Time to Sing (1968)
 The Young Runaways (1968)

References

Bibliography 
 Holston, Kim R. Movie Roadshows: A History and Filmography of Reserved-Seat Limited Showings, 1911–1973. McFarland, 2012.

External links 

1894 births
1970 deaths
People from New York City
American film editors